Knous is a surname of German origin. Notable people with the surname include:

Robert Lee Knous (1917–2000), American politician
William Lee Knous (1889–1959), American politician and judge

References

Surnames of German origin